Žvan is a village in the municipality of Demir Hisar, North Macedonia. It used to be part of the former municipality of Sopotnica.

Demographics
Bratin Dol is attested in the Ottoman defter of 1467/68 as a village in the vilayet of Manastir. The inhabitants  attested bore mixed Slavic-Albanian anthroponyms, such as Petko Gjergji and Bogdan Gjergj.

According to the 2002 census, the village had a total of 428 inhabitants. Ethnic groups in the village include:

Macedonians 428

References

Villages in Demir Hisar Municipality